Gordon H. "Slim" Chalmers (February 24, 1911 – January 18, 2000) was an American swimmer, swimming coach, and college athletics administrator. He competed in the men's 100 metre backstroke at the 1932 Summer Olympics.  He served as the athletic director at Iowa State University from 1959 to 1966 and at Indiana State University from 1967 to 1973

A resident of East Orange, New Jersey, Chalmers won the title in the 100-yard backstroke at the national interscholastic aquatic champions at Columbia University in March 1930, leading East Orange High School to a second-place team finish.

References

External links
 

1911 births
2000 deaths
American male backstroke swimmers
Army Black Knights swimming coaches
East Orange High School alumni
Franklin & Marshall Diplomats men's swimmers
Franklin & Marshall Diplomats men's soccer players
Iowa State Cyclones athletic directors
Indiana State Sycamores athletic directors
Lafayette Leopards swimming coaches
Lehigh Mountain Hawks swimming coaches
Olympic swimmers of the United States
Swimmers at the 1932 Summer Olympics
People from Cranford, New Jersey
Sportspeople from East Orange, New Jersey
Association footballers not categorized by position
Association football players not categorized by nationality
20th-century American people
21st-century American people